The Cambodia women's national basketball team is the basketball side that represents Cambodia in international competitions. It is administered by the Cambodia Basketball Federation.

3x3 Team
For the first time in history, Cambodia will feature both a "regular" 5x5 basketball team and a 3x3 basketball team at the 2021 Southeast Asian Games.

See also
 Cambodia men's national basketball team
 Cambodia women's national under-18 basketball team

References

External links
Cambodia Basketball Federation at fiba.com
Cambodia Basketball Federation - Facebook account

 
Women's national basketball teams